Desolation Sound is a 2005 Canadian drama film directed by Scott Weber and starring Hélène Joy, Jennifer Beals, Ed Begley Jr., Lothaire Bluteau and Ian Tracey.

Cast
Hélène Joy as Laurel Elliott
Jennifer Beals as Elizabeth Storey
Ian Tracey as Michael Elliott
Lothaire Bluteau as Benny
Ed Begley Jr. as Doug Shepard
Emily Hirst as Margaret Elliott
Haili Page as Nicole Shepard
Susan Bain as Nurse Rachel
Layne Black as Officer Wright

Reception
Liam Lacey of The Globe and Mail awarded the film one and half stars.

References

External links
 
 

Canadian drama films
2005 drama films
2005 films
English-language Canadian films
2000s English-language films
2000s Canadian films